Pontia helice, the meadow white, is a butterfly in the family Pieridae. It is found in southern Africa.

Wingspan is 35–40 mm in males and 37–43 mm in females. Flight period is year-round.

The larvae feed on Heliophila species, Lobularia maritima, Lepidum capense, Rapistrum rugosum, and Reseda odorata.

Subspecies
P. h. helice (Mozambique, Zimbabwe, southern Botswana, southern Namibia, South Africa, Eswatini, Lesotho)
P. h. johnstonii (Crowley, 1887) (Uganda, Kenya, Tanzania, Rwanda, Burundi, Democratic Republic of the Congo)

References

Seitz, A. Die Gross-Schmetterlinge der Erde 13: Die Afrikanischen Tagfalter. Plate XIII 14

helice
Butterflies of Africa
Lepidoptera of South Africa
Butterflies described in 1764
Taxa named by Carl Linnaeus